Rhipsalidopsis rosea, synonyms Hatiora rosea and Schlumbergera rosea, is a species of flowering plant in the family Cactaceae, native to south Brazil. It was first described, as Rhipsalis rosea, by Gustaf Lagerheim in 1912. It is one of the parents of the hybrid Rhipsalidopsis × graeseri, grown as the Easter or Whitsun cactus.

References

Rhipsalideae
Flora of South Brazil
Plants described in 1912